Breadalbane is a Canadian unincorporated community located in Charlotte County, New Brunswick. John Mann of Scotland died there.

History

Notable people

See also
List of communities in New Brunswick

References

Communities in Charlotte County, New Brunswick